Shiraro is a leather material that is wrapped around the waist.

In Tigriña, Shiraro is spelled Shirara and refers to a leather tunic decorated with small sea shells, usually worn by male farmers in the highlands.

Eritrean clothing